Próspero Mammana (2 May 1931 – 2 August 2007) was an Argentine wrestler. He competed in the men's freestyle featherweight at the 1952 Summer Olympics.

References

External links
 

1931 births
2007 deaths
Argentine male sport wrestlers
Olympic wrestlers of Argentina
Wrestlers at the 1952 Summer Olympics
Place of birth missing
20th-century Argentine people
21st-century Argentine people